Leonard Eastment (28 February 1901 – 29 July 1956) was an Australian politician. He was the Labor member for Ithaca in the Legislative Assembly of Queensland from 1952 to 1956.

Eastment died while in office and was buried in Toowong Cemetery.

References

	

1901 births
1956 deaths
Members of the Queensland Legislative Assembly
Place of birth missing
Burials at Toowong Cemetery
Australian Labor Party members of the Parliament of Queensland
20th-century Australian politicians